Sydney Walker (May 5, 1921 – September 30, 1994) was an American character actor of stage and screen and voice artist, with a career that spanned over five decades.

Early life
Born in Philadelphia, Pennsylvania, Walker developed an interest in drama from attending films as a child. He was especially enamored of death scenes, sometimes enacting them to entertain others. When he was 15, he began acting in little theater productions. He gained more experience through an apprenticeship with the Hedgerow Theatre in Pennsylvania. He left there to serve in World War II and then returned. He developed his skills further by studying at the Conservatory of Music and Dramatic Art in Paris, focusing on pantomime and singing.

Career
Walker was primarily a stage actor. After he studied in Paris, he performed at the Pasadena Playhouse and La Jolla Playhouse. His professional debut was in 1960 and he featured in twenty-eight Broadway plays between 1961 and 1973. In 1967, he was nominated for a Tony Award as "Best Featured Actor in a Play" for his performance in The Wild Duck.

Between 1966 and 1969 Walker was a principal player in Ellis Rabb's APA-Phoenix Repertory Company in New York City working with an extraordinary group including Rosemary Harris, Donald Moffet, Keene Curtis, Paul Sparer, Nancy Marchand, all of whom were to have significant careers in movies, television and theatre.

As a character actor in motion pictures, he appeared as Dr. Shapeley in the 1970 blockbuster film Love Story, and also appeared in The Way We Live Now and Puzzle of a Downfall Child the same year. His most prominent film role came in the 1992 movie Prelude to a Kiss, in which he was featured as a dying elderly man who switches bodies with a newlywed portrayed by Meg Ryan. He had a small role in the 1993 hit Mrs. Doubtfire as the bus driver who finds a small attraction to Mrs. Doubtfire, and played Mr. Wankmueller in the 1994 Macaulay Culkin comedy Getting Even with Dad. He also acted in the television soap opera The Guiding Light for the 1970–71 season.

Walker also provided the voice for the children's toy "Grampa Time" (a toy that had a nightlight and told bedtime stories).
His many television appearances included The Phil Silvers Show.
For a good part of his career (late 1970s through the 1980s), Walker was a teacher and principal actor at the Geary Theatre in San Francisco. He taught acting at the American Conservatory Theater (A.C.T.) there. He also immortalized roles such as Scrooge in A Christmas Carol, Lord Porteus in Somerset Maugham's The Circle, and Ash in The National Health by Peter Nichols, among many others.

Death
On September 30, 1994, Walker died of cancer in San Francisco, California.  He never married.

Filmography

References

External links

1921 births
1994 deaths
American male film actors
American male stage actors
American male voice actors
Male actors from Philadelphia
20th-century American male actors
20th-century American singers